The 2010 Korean League Cup, also known as the POSCO Cup 2010, was the 23rd competition of the Korean League Cup. It began on 22 May 2010, and ended on 25 August 2010.

Group stage

Allocation
The participating teams were assigned to one of three groups according to the 2009 K League table.

Group A

Group B

Group C

Ranking of third-placed teams

Knockout stage

Bracket

Quarter-finals

Semi-finals

Final

Top scorers

Awards

Source:

See also
 2010 in South Korean football
 2010 K League
 2010 Korean FA Cup

References

External links
Official website 
Review at K League 

2010
2010 domestic association football cups
2010 in South Korean football